The PSA Masters is a prestigious squash tournament which is one of the premier events on the Professional Squash Association (PSA) Tour. It is the only PSA World Tour event which is open exclusively to the top 32 players in the world rankings, and is  part of the PSA World Series. 

From 2000-01, the event was held in Egypt. It then moved to Qatar from 2002-04, and to Bermuda from 2005-06. The event was not held in 2007-08, and was then staged in New Delhi, India in 2009-2011. 

Since 2005, the draw for the event has featured 32 men. Prior to that, it featured 16 players. The 2010 tournament had a women's event.

Results

Men's

Women's

References

External links
Ispsquash.com - report on 2009 and 2010
PSA World Tour page
Masters